is a Japanese-born judoka, mixed martial artist, kickboxer and submission grappler who has held Croatian citizenship since 2019. 

Ishii won the gold medal in Olympic Judo at the Beijing 2008 Summer Olympics, a silver medal at the 2006 Asian Games and two All-Japan Judo Championships representing Japan. Ishii made his professional MMA debut at Dynamite!! 2009 losing to fellow Judoka gold medalist Hidehiko Yoshida by unanimous decision, but currently holds a record of 24–12–1. Ishii is currently under contract with Professional Fighters League. A professional mixed martial artist since 2009, Ishii has also competed for Rizin Fighting Federation and Bellator, and is the current HEAT Heavyweight Champion and SBC Heavyweight Champion.

Judo career

Ishii started Judo under the guidance of his father when he was in fifth grade of elementary school. He attended Kokushikan High School and then Kokushikan University in the Department of Physical Education.

Ishii won a gold medal at the Junior World Championships on 16 October 2004 in Budapest, Hungary. On 2 December 2006 he won a silver medal at the −100 kg category of the 2006 Asian Games. On April 29, 2006 and 2008, he won the All-Japan Judo Championships in Tokyo, Japan. With him the Japanese team won the World Judo team competition on 17 November 2007 in Beijing, China, this time in the +100 kg division.

On August 15, 2008 he won a gold medal at the +100 kg category of the Beijing 2008 Summer Olympics.

On 30 April 2011 Ishii returned to Judo to compete in the United States Championship in the open division; he won all the matches, securing the gold medal.

Mixed martial arts career

Early career
After winning the gold medal, Ishii expressed his wishes to apply his talents in the sport of mixed martial arts (MMA) to the dismay of the Japanese Judo Federation. Ishii originally confirmed that he signed a contract with Japanese MMA promotion Fighting and Entertainment Group (FEG) and was rumored to debut in early 2009 in their fight series, DREAM.

Japanese newspaper Sports Nippon then reported that Ishii would make his ring debut on December 31, 2009 at the annual K-1 Premium Dynamite!! event at the Saitama Super Arena. However, Ishii announced that he rejected FEG's offer, and was planning to pursue his MMA career in the US' Ultimate Fighting Championship (UFC). He headed to Florida where he trained with one of MMA's top camps American Top Team.

On June 1, 2009, Ishii announced he would join Japanese MMA organization World Victory Road. He officially signed with the organization at a public signing event on June 4, 2009. On September 14, 2009, it was announced that Ishii would make his MMA debut against fellow Olympian judo gold medalist Hidehiko Yoshida. Although the fight was originally to take place at World Victory Road's New Year show on December 31, when that event was cancelled, the fight was moved to DREAM's Dynamite!! 2009 card on New Year's Eve as a co-promoted show. Ishii, who was a large favorite in the fight, was dominated in the first round by the more-experienced Yoshida, taking many strikes including a right overhand that staggered the newcomer, along with a series of knees and uppercuts from the clinch. Ishii, however, came back with a more competitive second round, but took a point deduction after illegally kneeing Yoshida in the groin. Ishii continued to find his range in the third round with punches, but ultimately lost via unanimous decision.

For his second fight, Ishii faced New Zealand heavyweight kickboxing champion Tafa "Thumper" Misipati on May 15, 2010 in Auckland, New Zealand. The fight was the main event at the ETK production X-plosion: New Zealand vs. Japan. Ishii won via submission (armbar) in the first round.

In June 2010, Ishii caused controversy during an MMA exhibition match on the undercard of X-1 World Events: Nations Collide in Hawaii.  After knocking down his opponent Myles Tynanes at the end of the first-round, Ishii failed to stop punching his downed foe despite the referee's attempts to halt the action. He was subsequently disqualified for his actions.

On September 25, 2010, Ishii fought Ikuhisa Minowa, a shoot wrestler known for facing much larger opponents, at Dream.16 and won via unanimous decision.

Ishii's next MMA fight was supposed to be against Antz Nansen at the K-1 World MAX 2010. However, his opponent was changed to Katsuyori Shibata at the last minute. Ishii won via Kimura in the first round.

Ishii continued to train at Black House in Brazil with notable fighters such as Lyoto Machida and Anderson Silva. Prior to Silva's fight with Chael Sonnen Ishii hurt Silva's ribs. Since then he has trained at Mark Muñoz's gym Reign MMA, along with Mayhem Miller, Fabrício Werdum and other notable fighters.

Ishii then fought French kickboxing star Jérôme Le Banner in a mixed martial arts bout at the Dynamite!! 2010 New Year's Eve event. He won the fight via unanimous decision.

Ishii was scheduled to make his North America debut for Strikeforce at Strikeforce Challengers 15 against Scott Lighty, but a visa issue stemming from the recent earthquake and tsunami left him unable to leave Japan. Lorenz Larkin took his place in the fight.

In April 2011, it was reported that Ishii would retire from MMA and return to judo. Surprisingly, he said that he plans to earn American citizenship and represent the US at the 2016 Summer Olympics. However, he apparently decided against retiring from MMA as he went on to face former WEC Middleweight Champion Paulo Filho at Amazon Forest Combat 1 on September 14, 2011 in his light heavyweight debut. The fight ended in a controversial draw, with journalists as well as the crowd agreeing that Ishii had won all three rounds.

Satoshi Ishii next competed at Fight For Japan: Genki Desu Ka Omisoko 2011, where he met MMA legend Fedor Emelianenko.  He lost the fight via KO in the first round.

Japanese circuit

Inoki Genome Federation
After taking a year off from fighting to train following the Emelianenko loss, Ishii signed an exclusive multi fight deal with IGF in Japan. Here he has secured 6 victories in less than a year against former UFC Heavyweight Champion Tim Sylvia, UFC veterans Sean McCorkle, Kerry Schall, Pedro Rizzo and against Jeff Monson.

Ishii then faced Kazuyuki Fujita on December 31, 2013, for the IGF Championship. He won via unanimous decision, became the first IGF Champion.

Ishii defeated former UFC fighter Phil De Fries in a non-title bout via unanimous decision at IGF 1 on April 5, 2014 in a full pride rules match as the headline bout on the card.

On August 23 at IGF 2, Despite being a heavy favorite due to his years and judo experience Ishii was defeated by UFC, Pride and K-1 veteran Mirko Cro Cop via doctor stoppage, losing the IGF Championship in the process.

Ishii was expected to face PRIDE and Strikeforce veteran Sergei Kharitonov at M-1 Challenge 53: Battle in the Celestial Empire on November 11, 2014. However, Ishii withdrew from the fight due to injury.

Ishii faced Mirko Cro Cop in a rematch at December 31, 2014 for the IGF Championship. Early reports had the rematch cancelled due to a rib injury sustained by Ishii. However, in December 2014, it was reported that Ishii would be able to heal up in time to fight Cro Cop, and the rematch was official once again. Ishii lost the fight via TKO at the end of the second round.

After suffering back-to-back losses to Cro Cop, Ishii was scheduled to face Nick Rossborough at Inoki Genome Fight 3 on April 11, 2015. He won by a first-round submission.

Ishii fought Will Penn in his final IGF appearance, at Inoki Genome Fight 4 on August 29, 2015. He won the fight by a first-round submission.

Rizin FF
In his debut for the Rizin promotion, Ishii faced Jiří Procházka on December 29, 2015 at Rizin Fighting Federation World (8-men) Tournament. He lost the fight via knockout early in the first round. However there was some speculation about a possible fight fix, as a head kick thrown by Procházka appeared to be blocked by Ishii, but Ishii collapsed anyway and was finished off shortly after.

Ishii made his North American MMA debut against Quinton Jackson on June 24, 2016 at Bellator 157. He lost the fight via split decision. One judge scored the fight 29–28 to Ishii, while the other two judges scored it 29–28 and 30–27 for Jackson.

Ishii was scheduled to face Muhammed Lawal at Bellator 169 on December 16, 2016. He lost the fight by unanimous decision.

Following his third consecutive loss, Ishii was scheduled to face the long-time mixed martial arts veteran Heath Herring at Rizin 2017 in Yokohama: Sakura on April 16, 2017. He snapped his losing streak with a unanimous decision victory.

European circuit
Ishii was scheduled to face Ivan Shtyrkov at RCC Boxing Promotions: Russia vs Japan on July 9, 2017. He lost the fight by a first-round technical knockout, as Shtyrkov floored the Olympian with a right straight.

Ishii made his first and only Final Fight Championship appearance against Björn Schmiedeberg at Final Fight Championship 30 on October 21, 2017. He won the fight by a first-round submission.

Ishii was scheduled to face Rokas Stambrauskas at German MMMA Championship 17 on October 13, 2018. He won the fight by a first-round submission.

SBC Heavyweight champion
Ishii fought for the Serbian Battle Championship heavyweight title in his debut for the organization, against Tony Lopez at SBC 19 on December 1, 2018. He won the fight by a first-round submission.

Ishii made his first SBC heavyweight title defense against Rodrigo Carlos at Serbian Battle Championship 20 on February 16, 2019. He won the fight by a first-round technical knockout.

Ishii challenged Cally Gibrainn de Oliveira for the HEAT Heavyweight Championship at HEAT 44 on March 2, 2019. He claimed the title via second-round submission.

Ishii was scheduled to face the former KSW champion Fernando Rodrigues at KSW 47: The X-Warriors on March 23, 2019. He won the fight by split decision.

Professional Fighters League
On January 1, 2019, Ishii revealed that he had signed a contract with Professional Fighters League, and he took part in the second heavyweight regular season.

Ishii faced Zeke Tuinei Wily at PFL 3 on June 6, 2019 in his promotional debut. He won the fight by split decision.

Ishii faced Jared Rosholt at PFL 6 on August 8, 2019. He lost the fight by unanimous decision.

Ishii faced Denis Goltsov in the 2019 heavyweight quarterfinal bout at PFL 9 on October 31, 2019. He lost the fight by majority decision.

Later career
Ishii faced Jake Heun at Rizin 20 on December 31, 2019. He lost the fight via first-round knockout.

As his first HEAT title defense, Ishii faced Cleber Souza at HEAT 46 on January 19, 2020. He retained the title via first-round submission.

Ishii next faced Stuart Austin for the inaugural EMC Heavyweight Championship at EMC 5 on September 5, 2020. Ishii lost a controversial unanimous decision, to which his team decided to appeal.

Ishii faced Pietro Cappelli at EMC 7 on July 3, 2021. He won the fight by a first-round submission.

Ishii was scheduled to face Daniel Spohn at HEAT 50 on May 7, 2022. However, the bout was scrapped after Spohn tested positive for coronavirus. Ishii was instead booked to face Charlie Milner at FNC 6 on June 17, 2022. He won the fight by a first-round knockout.

Kickboxing career
On August 3, 2021, it was announced that Ishii had signed with K-1. He was scheduled to make his kickboxing debut against the one-time cruiserweight title challenger Ryo Aitaka at K-1 World GP 2021: Yokohamatsuri on September 20, 2021. Ishii won the fight by unanimous decision, after an extra round was fought.

Ishii was scheduled to make his second professional kickboxing appearance against RUI at K-1 World GP 2021 in Osaka on December 4, 2021. Ishii won the fight by unanimous decision.

Ishii took part in the 2022 K-1 openweight tournament, held at K-1: K'Festa 5 on April 3, 2022. He faced BigBang heavyweight champion Kosuke Jitsukata in the tournament quarterfinals. He won the fight by a  second-round knockout. Ishii withdrew from the tournament after this bout, due to a rib injury.

Ishii faced the former K-1 Heavyweight Champion in a super heavyweight bout at K-1 World GP 2023: K'Festa 6 on March 12, 2023. He lost the fight by unanimous decision, with scores of 30–29, 30–29 and 30–27.

Professional boxing career
Ishi made his professional boxing debut against Shuho Takayama (1–0) on August 14, 2022, as part of the "3150 Fight Vol 3" event. He won the fight by majority decision.

Ishii faced Chang Soo Han on January 6, 2023, as part of the "3150 Fight Vol 6" event. The fight was ruled a majority decision draw. Ishii announced his retirement from the sport of boxing during the post-fight press conference.

Personal life
Ishii was married for 9 months to Mika, a university student, divorcing in January 2011. In 2013, he married singer Asuka Hayashi. They divorced in 2016. They have one son.

In 2019, Ishii obtained Croatian citizenship and passport and had to give up Japanese citizenship and passport due to Japan's policy against dual citizenship.

Championships and accomplishments
Professional mixed martial arts
Serbian Battle Championship
SBC Heavyweight Championship (One time; current)
 One successful title defense
Inoki Genome Federation
IGF Championship (1 time)
HEAT
HEAT Heavyweight Championship (One time; current)
One successful title defense

Mixed martial arts record

|-
|Win
|align=center|25–12–1
|Charlie Milner
|TKO (punches)
|FNC 6
|
|align=center|1 
|align=center|0:40
|Karlovac, Croatia
|
|-
|Win
|align=center|24–12–1
|Pietro Cappelli
|Submission (north-south choke)
|EMC 7
|
|align=center| 1
|align=center| 2:41
|Ratingen, Germany
|
|-
|Loss
|align=center|23–12–1
|Stuart Austin
|Decision (unanimous)
|EMC 5
|
|align=center| 3
|align=center| 5:00
|Dusseldorf, Germany
|
|-
|Win
|align=center|23–11–1
|Cleber Souza
|Submission (armlock)
|HEAT 46
|
|align=center| 1
|align=center| 3:24
|Tokyo, Japan
|
|-
|Loss
|align=center|22–11–1
|Jake Heun
|TKO (punches)
|Rizin 20
|
|align=center| 1
|align=center| 1:18
|Saitama, Japan
|
|-
|Loss
|align=center|
|Denis Goltsov
|Decision (majority)
|PFL 9
|
|align=center| 2
|align=center| 5:00
|Las Vegas, Nevada, United States
|
|-
|Loss
|align=center|22–9–1
|Jared Rosholt
|Decision (unanimous)
|PFL 6
|
|align=center| 3
|align=center| 5:00
|Atlantic City, New Jersey, United States
|
|-
|Win
|align=center|22–8–1
|Zeke Tuinei Wily
|Decision (split)
|PFL 3
|
|align=center| 3
|align=center| 5:00
|New York, United States
|
|-
|Win
|align=center|21–8–1
|Fernando Rodrigues Jr.
|Decision (split)
|KSW 47: The X-Warriors
|
|align=center| 3
|align=center| 5:00
|Łódź, Poland
|
|-
|Win
|align=center|20–8–1
|Cally Gibrainn de Oliveira
|Submission (armlock)
|HEAT 44
|
|align=center|2
|align=center|3:54
|Nagoya, Japan
|
|-
|-
|Win
|align=center|19–8–1
|Rodrigo Carlos
|TKO (punches)
|Serbian Battle Championship 20
|
|align=center|1
|align=center|1:42
|Sombor, Serbia
|
|-
|Win
|align=center|18–8–1
|Tony Lopez
|Submission (leg scissor choke)
|Serbian Battle Championship 19
|
|align=center|1
|align=center|4:42
|Novi Sad, Serbia
| 
|-
|Win
|align=center|17–8–1
|Rokas Stambrauskas
|Submission (leg scissor choke)
|German MMMA Championship 17
|
|align=center|1
|align=center|4:43
|Düsseldorf, Germany
|
|-
|Win
|align=center|16–8–1
|Björn Schmiedeberg
|Submission (kimura)
|Final Fight Championship 30
|
|align=center|1
|align=center|2:36
|Linz, Austria
|
|-
|Loss
|align=center|15–8–1
|Ivan Shtyrkov
|TKO (punches)
|RCC Boxing Promotions: Russia vs Japan
|
|align=center|2
|align=center|3:43
|Yekaterinburg, Russia
|
|-
|Win
|align=center|15–7–1
|Heath Herring
|Decision (unanimous)
|Rizin 2017 in Yokohama: Sakura
|
|align=center|2
|align=center|5:00
|Yokohama, Japan
|
|-
| Loss
| align=center| 14–7–1
| Muhammed Lawal
| Decision (unanimous)
| Bellator 169
| 
| align=center| 3
| align=center| 5:00
| Dublin, Ireland
| 
|-
| Loss
| align=center| 14–6–1
| Quinton Jackson
| Decision (split)
| Bellator 157: Dynamite 2
| 
| align=center| 3
| align=center| 5:00
| St. Louis, Missouri, United States
| 
|-
| Loss
| align=center| 14–5–1
| Jiří Procházka
| KO (head kick and knees)
| Rizin World Grand Prix 2015: Part 1 - Saraba 
| 
| align=center| 1
| align=center| 1:36
| Saitama, Japan
| 
|-
| Win
| align=center| 14–4–1
| Will Penn
| Submission (rear-naked choke)
| Inoki Genome Fight 4
| 
| align=center| 1
| align=center| 3:07
| Tokyo, Japan
| 
|-
| Win
| align=center| 13–4–1
| Nick Rossborough
| Submission (kimura)
| Inoki Genome Fight 3
| 
| align=center| 1
| align=center| 4:22
| Tokyo, Japan
| 
|-
| Loss
| align=center| 12–4–1
| Mirko Cro Cop
| TKO (head kick and punches)
| Inoki Bom-Ba-Ye 2014
| 
| align=center| 2
| align=center| 5:00
| Tokyo, Japan
| 
|-
| Loss
| align=center| 12–3–1
| Mirko Cro Cop
| TKO (doctor stoppage)
| Inoki Genome Fight 2
| 
| align=center| 2
| align=center| 2:37
| Tokyo, Japan
| 
|-
| Win
| align=center| 12–2–1
| Philip De Fries
| Decision (unanimous)
| Inoki Genome Fight 1
| 
| align=center| 2
| align=center| 5:00
| Tokyo, Japan
| 
|-
| Win
| align=center| 11–2–1
| Kazuyuki Fujita
| Decision (unanimous)
| Inoki Bom-Ba-Ye 2013
| 
| align=center| 3
| align=center| 5:00
| Tokyo, Japan
| 
|-
| Win
| align=center| 10–2–1
| Jeff Monson
| Decision (majority)
| M-1 Challenge 42
| 
| align=center| 3
| align=center| 5:00
| St. Petersburg, Russia
| 
|-
| Win
| align=center| 9–2–1
| Clayton Jones
| TKO (punches)
| IGF: GENOME 27
| 
| align=center| 1
| align=center| 0:35
| Osaka, Japan
| 
|-
| Win
| align=center| 8–2–1
| Pedro Rizzo
| Decision (unanimous)
| IGF: GENOME 26
| 
| align=center| 3
| align=center| 5:00
| Tokyo, Japan
| 
|-
| Win
| align=center| 7–2–1
| Kerry Schall
| Submission (americana)
| IGF: GENOME 25
| 
| align=center| 1
| align=center| 2:43
| Fukuoka, Japan
| 
|-
| Win
| align=center| 6–2–1
| Sean McCorkle
| Submission (kimura)
| IGF: GENOME 24
| 
| align=center| 1
| align=center| 2:41
| Tokyo, Japan
| 
|-
| Win
| align=center| 5–2–1
| Tim Sylvia
| Decision (unanimous)
| Inoki-Bom-Ba-Ye 2012
| 
| align=center| 3
| align=center| 5:00
| Tokyo, Japan
| 
|-
| Loss
| align=center| 4–2–1
| Fedor Emelianenko
| KO (punches)
| Fight For Japan: Genki Desu Ka Omisoka 2011
| 
| align=center| 1
| align=center| 2:29
| Saitama, Japan
|
|-
| Draw
| align=center| 4–1–1
| Paulo Filho
| Draw
| Amazon Forest Combat 1
| 
| align=center| 3
| align=center| 5:00
| Manaus, Brazil
| 
|-
| Win
| align=center| 4–1
| Jérôme Le Banner
| Decision (unanimous)
| Dynamite!! 2010
| 
| align=center| 3
| align=center| 5:00
| Saitama, Japan
| 
|-
| Win
| align=center| 3–1
| Katsuyori Shibata
| Submission (kimura)
| K-1 World MAX 2010 World Championship Tournament Final
| 
| align=center| 1
| align=center| 3:30
| Tokyo, Japan
| 
|-
| Win
| align=center| 2–1
| Ikuhisa Minowa
| Decision (unanimous)
| Dream 16
| 
| align=center| 2
| align=center| 5:00
| Nagoya, Japan
| 
|-
| Win
| align=center| 1–1
| Tafa Misipati
| Submission (armbar)
| X-plosion: New Zealand vs. Japan
| 
| align=center| 1
| align=center| 2:42
| Auckland, New Zealand
| 
|-
| Loss
| align=center| 0–1
| Hidehiko Yoshida
| Decision (unanimous)
| Dynamite!! The Power of Courage 2009
| 
| align=center| 3
| align=center| 5:00
| Saitama, Japan
|

Kickboxing record

|- style="background:#fbb;"
| 2023-03-12 || Loss||align=left| Kyotaro Fujimoto || K-1 World GP 2023: K'Festa 6 || Tokyo, Japan || Decision (Unanimous)||3  || 3:00
|-
|- style="background:#cfc"
| 2022-04-03 || Win ||align=left| Kosuke Jitsukata || K-1: K'Festa 5, Tournament Quarterfinals || Tokyo, Japan || KO (Left straight) || 2 || 1:02
|-
! style=background:white colspan=9 |
|-  style="text-align:center; background:#cfc"
| 2021-12-04 || Win || align=left| Rui || K-1 World GP 2021 in Osaka || Osaka, Japan || Decision (Unanimous) || 3 || 3:00
|-
|- style="background:#cfc"
| 2021-09-20 || Win ||align=left| Ryo Aitaka || K-1 World GP 2021: Yokohamatsuri || Yokohama, Japan || Ext. R. Decision (Unanimous) || 4 || 3:00
|-
| colspan=9 | Legend:

Professional boxing record

Submission grappling record
{| class="wikitable sortable" style="font-size:80%; text-align:left;"
|-
| colspan=8 style="text-align:center;" | 5 Matches, 1 Win, 1 Loss, 3 Draws
|- style="text-align:center; background:#f0f0f0;"
| style="border-style:none none solid solid; "|Result
| style="border-style:none none solid solid; "|Record
| style="border-style:none none solid solid; "|Opponent
| style="border-style:none none solid solid; "|Method
| style="border-style:none none solid solid; "|Event
| style="border-style:none none solid solid; "|Date
| style="border-style:none none solid solid; "|Division
| style="border-style:none none solid solid; "|Location
|-
|Loss||style="text-align:center;"|1–1–3|| Daniel Strauss || Points || Polaris 8 || December 9, 2018|| Superfight|| Cardiff
|-
|Win||style="text-align:center;"|1–0–3|| Frank Mir || DQ || Quintet 3 || October 5, 2018|| Superfight||  Las Vegas, NV
|-
|Draw||style="text-align:center;"|0–0–3|| Geo Martinez || Draw || Quintet 2 || July 15, 2018 || Absolute ||  Tokyo
|-
|Draw||style="text-align:center;"|0–0–2|| Marcos de Souza || Draw || Quintet || April 11, 2018|| Absolute||  Tokyo
|-
|Draw||style="text-align:center;"|0–0–1|| Vladimir Matyushenko || Draw || Metamoris 7 || July 17, 2016|| Superfight||  Los Angeles, CA
|-

References

External links

 
 
 
 Official Satoshi Ishii Tee KO Merch

1986 births
Living people
Asian Games medalists in judo
Asian Games silver medalists for Japan
Croatian male mixed martial artists
Croatian practitioners of Brazilian jiu-jitsu
Heavyweight mixed martial artists
Japanese emigrants to Croatia
Japanese expatriate sportspeople in Croatia
Japanese male judoka
Japanese male kickboxers
Japanese male boxers
Japanese male mixed martial artists
Japanese practitioners of Brazilian jiu-jitsu
People awarded a black belt in Brazilian jiu-jitsu
Judoka at the 2006 Asian Games
Judoka at the 2008 Summer Olympics
Light heavyweight mixed martial artists
Medalists at the 2006 Asian Games
Medalists at the 2008 Summer Olympics
Mixed martial artists utilizing judo
Mixed martial artists utilizing kickboxing
Mixed martial artists utilizing Brazilian jiu-jitsu
Naturalized citizens of Croatia
Olympic judoka of Japan
Olympic gold medalists for Japan
Olympic medalists in judo
People from Ibaraki, Osaka
Recipients of the Medal with Purple Ribbon
Universiade medalists in judo
Universiade gold medalists for Japan
Medalists at the 2007 Summer Universiade